The Great Cat and Dog Massacre is a non-fiction book written by Hilda Kean. It tells the story of the British pet massacre, the September 1939 time period at the start of World War II, when hundreds of thousands of British family pets were preemptively euthanized in anticipation of air raids and resource shortages.

Kean also uses the episode to discuss people's feelings about their pets and the psychology of a population at war.

The book was published in 2017 by University of Chicago Press. Its title is a reference to Robert Darnton's 1984 work The Great Cat Massacre.

References

External links

2017 non-fiction books
History books about World War II
United Kingdom in World War II
University of Chicago Press books